Fiona Doyle (born 4 October 1991) is an Irish swimmer. She represented Ireland in the 2016 Rio Olympics swimming in the 100M and 200M Breaststroke. In 2013, she competed in the 100m event at the World Aquatics Championships in Barcelona where she finished eleventh overall.
She won a silver medal in the 100 m breaststroke at the 2013 Summer Universiade. In recognition of her achievements she was awarded Swim Alberta Female International Swimmer of the Year 2012/2013, University of Calgary female Athlete of the Year 2013 and SwimIreland High Performance Athlete of the Year 2013, 2014 and 2015.

Early life
Fiona attended primary school at St. Nessan's National School in Mungret, Co. Limerick, she then moved to the Crescent College Comprehensive in Dooradoyle, Co. Limerick for her second level education. When she moved to Dublin in 2009 she attended the Institute of Education for her final year.

Fiona and her twin sister Eimear learned to swim in Saint Paul’s Swimming Club which was founded in 1974 by their paternal grandad Michael J. Doyle. They then progressed to lane swimming and transferred to Limerick Swimming Club and were coached by Gerry Ryan, John Dempsey, Anne Mulcair and Barbara Nalewko. Fiona also has four other siblings.

Career
In 2005, Fiona qualified for her first major international swim meet, the European Youth Olympic Festival in which she placed 4th in the 100m breaststroke in a time of 1.13. and broke her previously held Irish Record in the process. Later that summer, she went on to better that time and win a gold medal at the British Age Group Championships, Sheffield.
In 2006, Swim Ireland established a High Performance centre in Limerick at the University of Limerick Arena. Fiona and Eimear were amongst the first swimmers to be selected for the new squad coached by Canadian, Steve Price and in 2007, they represented Ireland at the European Junior Swimming Championships in Antwerp where they both made finals.
In 2008 Fiona moved to Edmonton for eight weeks in an attempt to qualify for the Beijing Olympics and trained with Steve Price who had taken up the Head Coach position with EKSC, earlier in the year. While in Canada she competed in the 2008 Alberta Senior Provincial Championship in Calgary where she won Gold in the 200Breaststroke breaking the Irish Junior record in a time of 2:35.26 and took silver in the 50 & 100 Breaststroke and 100 Freestyle. While she failed to achieve the A qualifying standard she was determined to pursue a dream she had since she was eleven to swim at the Olympics. In 2009, she moved to Dublin to train with Portmarnock Swimming Club and the NAC High Performance Centre where she was coached by Anne Burdis, Peter O’Brien and Paul O’Donovan.
 
Fiona accepted a sports scholarship from the University of Calgary as it had a proven track record under Head-Coach Mike Blondal, in coaching international and Olympic class swimmers and has one of the top performing women’s swimming team in the CIS

In 2014 competed in the European Long Course Championships, where she placed 7th in the 50m breaststroke.

Swim Ireland awarded her athlete of the year 2014 for the second year running.

In 2015, Fiona was awarded the 2015 CIS female swimmer of the year after winning all the breaststroke events. This was the first time since 2009 that a clean sweep was accomplished in the breaststroke events.

During the 2015 World University Games, in Gwangju South Korea, Fiona placed 2nd in the 50m breaststroke and 3rd in the 100m breaststroke and became the first Irish swimmer to qualify for the 2016 Summer Olympics.

International competition
Fiona has represented Ireland in the following competitions;
2005 EYOF Lignano 
2005 European Short Course Championships Trieste 
2006 European Junior Championships Majorica 
2007 European Junior Championships Antwerp 
2008 FINA Youth World Swimming Championships Monterey 
2008 European Short Course Championships Croatia 
2009 World Aquatics Championships XIII FINA World Championships Rome 
2011 Summer Universiade World University Games Shenzhen 
2013 Summer Universiade World University Games Kazan 
2013 World Aquatics Championships XV FINA World Championships Barcelona
2013 Duel in the Pool Championships Europe vs. USA Glasgow 
2014 European Long Course Championships Berlin
2015 Summer Universiade World University Games Gwangju
2015 World Aquatics Championships XVI FINA World Championships Kazan
2016 European Long Course Championships London
2016 Rio Olympic Games

References

External links
 Fiona Doyle at Swim Ireland
 
 
 

1991 births
Living people
Irish female swimmers
Olympic swimmers of Ireland
Swimmers at the 2016 Summer Olympics
Universiade medalists in swimming
Universiade silver medalists for Ireland
Universiade bronze medalists for Ireland
Medalists at the 2013 Summer Universiade
Medalists at the 2015 Summer Universiade